The neckline is the top edge of a garment that surrounds the neck, especially from the front view. Neckline also refers to the overall line between all the layers of clothing and the neck and shoulders of a person, ignoring the unseen undergarments.

For each garment worn above the waist, the neckline is primarily a style line and may be a boundary for further shaping of the upper edge of a garment with, for example, a collar, cowl, darts, or pleats. In that respect it is similar to the waistline and hemline.

List of neckline types

Necklines can be grouped into categories according to their shape and where they cut across the body:
 Boat neck (one edge, nearly linear)
 A high, wide, slightly curved neckline that passes past the collarbones and hangs on both shoulders; also called a bateau neckline or Sabrina neckline. A variation is the portrait neckline.
 Deep or plunging neck
These are low necklines, in either V, U or square shapes, that reveal various amounts of cleavage, and some even extending to the natural waist line.
 Funnel neck 
A neckline with fabric standing high and close to the neck, cut or knit in one piece with the torso rather than as an added collar
 Halter neckline (linear, side edges converge on neck)
These feature a V-neck or scoop front neckline with straps which wrap around and connect at the nape of the neck.
 Illusion neckline
A compromise between a low and a high neckline, it combines a low (usually strapless) neckline with semi-transparent fabric (sheer fabric or lace) along the top part, thus creating a second, higher neckline. This neckline is often seen on traditional white wedding dresses.
 Jewel neckline (circular)
These are round and sit at the base of the throat, and are also called the T-shirt neckline or crew neck.
 Keyhole neckline
These are similar to halter necklines, but the converging diagonal lines meet in front of the neck, forming a "keyhole".  More generally, these feature a central hole, usually just below the collar bones.  These necklines are seen infrequently.
 Off-the-shoulder (one edge, nearly linear. Also known as Carmen neckline)
These are similar to boat necklines but are significantly lower, below the shoulders and collar bone.  Usually these pass over the arms but, in the strapless neckline style, may pass under the arms. These necklines reveal and accentuate the wearer's shoulders, collar bone and neck.
 One-shoulder neckline (one edge, nearly linear)
These are asymmetrical linear necklines that cut across the torso diagonally, usually from one shoulder to under the other arm.
 Polo neck (circular)
These are high close-fitting collars that wrap around the neck itself, and are also called turtlenecks. They are most common for sweaters (also called jumpers) or jerseys.
 Portrait neckline
A portrait neckline is a V-neck with the edges of the V placed out at the points of the shoulders rather than closer to the neck; it can be combined with a surplice neckline.
 Scoop neck (curved, concave up)
These have a curved U-shape, with the arms of the U hanging on the shoulders. The depth of the U can vary, ranging from demure styles to plunging.
 Square neck (linear side edges neither converge nor diverge)
These are characterized by three linear edges, the bottom edge meeting the side edges at right angles.  The bottom edge cuts across the figure horizontally and the side edges pass over the shoulders.  A special case of this is the slot neckline, in which the side edges are very close (roughly the width of the collar-bone points), forming a narrow slot.
 Surplice neckline
These are similar to how a bathrobe's neckline is formed by one side of the garment overlapping the other. For a dress, the lower layer is usually sewn to the top layer just under the bust.
 Sweetheart neckline (side edges linear, curved bottom edge concave down)
These have a curved bottom edge that is concave down and usually doubly scalloped to resemble the top half of a heart.  The side edges often converge on the neck, similar to halter necklines.  Sweetheart necklines accentuate the bosom.
 V-neck (2–4 linear edges, side edges diverge)
 Originating from the Middle East, these are formed by two diagonal lines from the shoulders that meet on the chest creating a V shape.  The depth of the V can vary, ranging from demure styles to plunging.  The V may also be truncated by a small bottom edge, forming a trapezoid.

Modifications of necklines
The shape of a necklines can be modified in many ways, e.g., by adding a collar or scarf, overlaying it with a gauzy material or decorating the edges with scallops, picots or ruffles. The neckline can be a sharp edge of fabric or a more gentle cowl, and can also be accentuated by pattern(s) in the fabric itself.

Ruffs were popular in the Elizabethan era.

Trends

Off-the-shoulders 

The off-the-shoulder trend dates back to the Regency and Victorian Era. They were the height of fashion in the early to mid-nineteenth century. Charles Frederick Worth, the father of haute couture, designed many elaborate dresses, many of which featured bodices with off-the-shoulder sleeves and were very popular with prominent figures like . Then in 1960s, French actress Brigitte Bardot put her own twist on this style, wearing off-the-shoulder tops with everything from midi skirts to pants, reviving the style. The style icon made off-the-shoulder sexy and trendy again and off-the-shoulder style also became known as the “Bardot” style.

See also 
 Bustline
 Cleavage 
 Hemline
 Low-rise (fashion)
 Top (clothing)
 Waistline

References

External links 

 
Neckwear